Yadak is a village in Shirin Darreh Rural District, in the Central District of Quchan County, Razavi Khorasan Province, Iran. At the 2016 census, its population was 1,731, in 552 families.

References 
Statistical center of Iran

Populated places in Quchan County